The  is a museum dedicated to the shellfish of the world in Rankoshi, Hokkaidō, Japan. Ammonites and other aquatic molluscs from Hokkaidō's fossil record are also exhibited. Comprising two buildings, the first opened in 1991 and the second in 1994. In 2017, the Shellfish Museum of Rankoshi together with the University of Toyama announced the discovery of a new species of clione.

See also
 Niseko-Shakotan-Otaru Kaigan Quasi-National Park

References

External links

 Shellfish Museum of Rankoshi 

Museums in Hokkaido
Natural history museums in Japan
1991 establishments in Japan
Museums established in 1991
Aquatic molluscs
Rankoshi, Hokkaido